Cratacanthus dubius is a species of beetle in the family Carabidae, the only species in the genus Cratacanthus.

References

Harpalinae